Veteran Avia was a cargo airline based in Sharjah, U.A.E. The airline was established in 2009 and started operations on 16 June 2009. It operated freight services to destinations throughout the CIS and Europe. Its main base was Zvartnots International Airport, Yerevan. The airline ceased operations in 2014.

Operations
Veteran Avia operated Charter flights into Afghanistan, Europe and throughout the CIS.

Fleet
 1 Boeing 747-200F

References

External links

Veteran Avia LLC official website

Defunct airlines of Armenia
Airlines established in 2009
Airlines disestablished in 2014
Armenian companies established in 2009
Defunct charter airlines